Ngawa is one of the Reef Islands located in Temotu Province of the independent nation of the Solomon Islands.

Archaeology
In 1971 there were archaeological excavations of pottery sites on the island.

References

Islands of the Solomon Islands
Polynesian outliers